CJMM-FM is a Canadian radio station, broadcasting at 99.1 FM in Rouyn-Noranda, Quebec and 92.5 FM in La Sarre, Quebec. The station, branded as Énergie 99.1-92.5, airs a francophone mainstream rock format.

The majority of the station's schedule is simulcasted with its sister station in Val-d'Or, CJMV-FM.

CJMM has a community-owned rebroadcaster at the La Grande-1 generating station which broadcasts on the frequency 93.1 FM with the callsign CFAA-FM.

References

External links
 Énergie 99.1-92.5
 
 
 

Jmm
Jmm
Jmm
Jmm
Radio stations established in 2004
2004 establishments in Quebec